Prevenge is a 2016 British comedy slasher film written by, directed by and starring Alice Lowe in her directorial debut. The film also stars Kate Dickie, Kayvan Novak, Jo Hartley, Mike Wozniak, Gemma Whelan and Tom Davis. The plot follows a pregnant widow who is convinced her foetus is compelling her to embark on a killing spree as revenge for the death of her husband.

Principal photography mainly took place in Cardiff in under two weeks, whilst Lowe was herself pregnant. The film was released in cinemas in February 2017. Before the film was released, Lowe gave birth to a baby girl, Della, who was able to portray Ruth’s newborn in the film, at 10 days old.

Plot
After her partner dies in a climbing accident when he was cut loose by the rest of his group, Ruth, now heavily pregnant, becomes convinced that her foetus is compelling her to murder and she tracks down the other people who were involved in the climbing accident for revenge. Her first victim is the owner of a reptile shop, whom she kills by slitting his throat. When her midwife tells her that the baby will let her know what’s good for her, Ruth reveals that she thinks that her baby is already telling her what to do. Between several midwife appointments, Ruth kills people. On one of her last attempts to murder, Ruth suffers a life-threatening emergency regarding her baby. Her baby thus is delivered quickly via emergency caesarean section.  Several days after the surgery,  Ruth is quite depressed but soon realises that her baby is just a normal baby girl, not a psychopathic baby.  The midwife tried to reassure Ruth that everything is going to be okay, and goes off to get the health assistant to help Ruth with her feelings. Ruth takes this time to kiss her baby goodbye and go off to the cliffs to kill one last time.

Cast
 Alice Lowe as Ruth
 Jo Hartley as the Midwife
 Gemma Whelan as Len
 Kate Dickie as Ella
 Kayvan Novak as Tom
 Tom Davis as DJ Dan
 Dan Renton Skinner as Mr Zabek
 Mike Wozniak as Josh
 Tom Meeten as Zac
 Eileen Davies as Jill
 Della Moon Synnott as Baby

Reception

Prevenge received positive reviews from critics for its blend of black comedy and horror. The site's consensus reads, "As ambitious as it is daringly transgressive, Prevenge should thrill fans of pitch black horror comedy - and open untold opportunities for writer/director/star Alice Lowe."

Accolades

References

External links
 
 

2016 films
2016 horror films
2016 comedy horror films
2016 black comedy films
2016 independent films
British independent films
British satirical films
British slasher films
British black comedy films
Films shot in Wales
British pregnancy films
2016 directorial debut films
2016 comedy films
Films shot in Cardiff
2010s English-language films
2010s British films